Trevor Hay (17 October 1945 – 12 August 2016) was an Australian chess player and winner of the Australian Chess Championship in 1972.

Biography
Trevor Hay was one of the strongest chess players in Australia in the 1960s and 1970s. He won Australian Junior Chess Championship in 1961. Trevor Hay participated in Australian Chess Championships and won gold (1972) and silver (1963) medals. Also he won Australian Open Chess Championship in 1977.

Trevor Hay played for Australia in the Chess Olympiads:
 In 1964, at first reserve board in the 16th Chess Olympiad in Tel Aviv (+5, =3, -1),
 In 1972, at third board in the 20th Chess Olympiad in Skopje (+8, =1, -1).

References

External links

Trevor Hay chess games at 365chess.com

1945 births
2016 deaths
Sportspeople from Wagga Wagga
Australian chess players
Chess Olympiad competitors